The Khanty (Khanty: ханти, hanti), also known in older literature as Ostyaks are a Ugric indigenous people, living in Khanty–Mansi Autonomous Okrug, a region historically known as "Yugra" in Russia, together with the Mansi. In the autonomous okrug, the Khanty and Mansi languages are given co-official status with Russian. In the 2010 Census, 30,943 persons identified themselves as Khanty.  Of those, 26,694 were resident in Tyumen Oblast, of whom 17,128 were living in Khanty–Mansi Autonomous Okrug and 8,760—in Yamalo-Nenets Autonomous Okrug. 873 were residents of neighbouring Tomsk Oblast, and 88 lived in the Komi Republic.

Ethnonym 
Since the Khanty language has about 10 dialects which can be united in 3 main branches, there are several slightly different words used by these people to describe themselves:
Khanti, Khante (in North)
Khande (in South)
Kantek, Kantakh (in East)
All these words mean Human. They also call themselves As Khoyat which means Obian People or People from Ob.

History 
In the second millennium BC, the territories between the Kama and the Irtysh Rivers were the home of a Proto-Uralic-speaking population that had contacts with Proto-Indo-European speakers from the south. The woodland population is the ancestor of the modern Ugrian inhabitants of Trans-Uralia. Other researchers say that the Khanty people originated in the south Ural steppe and moved northwards into their current location about 500 AD.

Khanty probably appear in Russian records under the name Yugra (ca. 11th century), when they had contact with Novgorodian hunters and merchants. The name comes from Komi-Zyrian language jögra ('Khanty'). The older Russian name Ostyak is from Khanty as-kho 'person from the Ob (as) River,' with -yak after other ethnic terms like Permyak.

Some Khanty princedoms were partially included in the Siberia Khanate from the 1440s–1570s.

In the 11th century, Yugra was actually a term for numerous tribes, each having its own centre and its own chief. Every tribe had two exogamic phratries, termed mon't''' and por, and all members were considered to be blood relatives. This structure was later replaced with clans, where each clan leader (knyazets) negotiated with the Russian realm. They also participated in Russian campaigns, and received the right to collect yasaq (tribute) from two Khanty volosts (districts) respectively. When this structure was no longer needed, Russia deprived them of their privileges.

After the Russian conquest of Siberia, Russians attempted to Christianize the Khanty. Russian missionaries and officials instructed that idols be destroyed, mass baptisms be performed, and harsh punishment for those that disobeyed the church. Russian officials also took Khanty children as hostages and converted them to Christianity. Conversions were generally superficial in nature and motivated by economic incentives. As a consequence, the Khanty continued to incorporate native practices and beliefs into their spirituality.

During the Soviet period the Khanty were one of the few indigenous minorities of Siberia to be granted an autonomy in the form of an okrug (autonomous district). The establishment of autonomy has played a considerable role in consolidation of the ethnos (the Western Khants called their eastern neighbours Kantõk'' [the Other People]). However, in the 1930s concerted efforts were made by the Soviet state to collectivise them. The initial stages of this meant the execution of tribal chiefs, who were labelled "kulaks", followed by the execution of shamans. The abduction by the state of the children who were sent to Russian-speaking boarding schools provoked a national revolt in 1933 called the Kazym rebellion.

After the end of the Stalin period this process was relaxed and efforts were intensified in the 1980s and 1990s to protect their common territory from industrial expansion of various ministries and agencies. The autonomy has also played a major role in preserving the traditional culture and language.

Organisation 
The Khanty are one of the indigenous minorities in Siberia with an autonomy in the form of an okrug (autonomous area).

Culture

Economy and livelihood 
The Khantys' traditional occupations were fishery, taiga hunting and reindeer herding. They lived as trappers, thus gathering was of major importance.

During the winter, the Khanty lived in stationary huts made out of earth and branches at permanent villages. During the spring, the Khanty moved towards hunting and fishing grounds, where they constructed temporary rectangular-shaped shelters out of birch-bark and poles.

Weapons utilized by the Khanty were advanced for the period and included longbows, arrows, spears, and the use of iron helmets and chain mail.

Religion 

Most Khanty are today Orthodox Christians, mixed with traditional beliefs (shamans, reincarnation). Their historical shaman wore no special clothes except a cap. Traditional Khanty cults are closely related to nature. The Crow spring celebration is being celebrated in April, nowadays it is April 7, the same day as the Annunciation day. The Bear Celebration is being celebrated occasionally after a successful hunting of a bear. The Bear Celebration continues 5 or 6 days (the duration depends on the sex of the animal). Over 300 songs and performances occur during a Bear Celebration. The most important parts of the celebration are:
 Nukh Kiltatty Ar (The Awakening Song) 
 Ily Vukhalty Ar (The Coming Down From The Sky Song) - The story about the son of Torum (the sky god). The son was sent by Torum to rule the Earth. He has forgotten father's advice, lost his immortality, turned into a beast and has been killed by the hunters. 
  Il Veltatty Ar (The Lullaby)

Language 

The Khanty language is part of the Ugric branch of the Uralic languages, and thus most closely related to Mansi and Hungarian.

Notable Khanty 
 Ambal (fl. 16th and 17th c.), Khanty and Tatar prince

Gallery

See also 
 Iyrcae

Notes

External links 

 KHANTIA-MANSIA – YUGRA
 Khants — Some pictures of Khants' bird and fishery traps
 Redbook: The Khants
 Survival International
 Endangered Uralic Peoples: Khants or Ostyaks
 http://www.siberianlanguages.surrey.ac.uk/summary/

 
Ethnic groups in Russia
Ancient peoples
Ethnic groups in Siberia
Nomadic groups in Eurasia
Khanty people
History of Ural
Indigenous peoples of North Asia
Ugric peoples
Indigenous small-numbered peoples of the North, Siberia and the Far East
Modern nomads